Copenhagen Suborbitals is an amateur, crowd-funded, and open-source human space program. Since its beginning in 2008, Copenhagen Suborbitals has flown five home-built rockets and two mock-up space capsules. The organization successfully launched its Nexø II rocket in the summer of 2018. Its stated goal is to have one of the members fly into space (above 100 km), on a sub-orbital spaceflight, in a space capsule on the Spica rocket. The organisation was founded by Kristian von Bengtson and Peter Madsen. 

As a developing organization, the 55 members use their spare time on the project, while at the same time having regular day-jobs. At the annual general assembly, they elect a chairman and board members. , the chairman is Carsten Olsen.

History

Copenhagen Suborbitals was founded in 2008 by Kristian von Bengtson and Peter Madsen as a non-profit, crowd-funded project where important aspects of the operation were described in detail on blogs and lectures.

On 23 February 2014 the board of Copenhagen Suborbitals announced that Kristian von Bengtson had left the group, after falling out with Madsen. In June 2014 Madsen also left, after years of disagreement with the other members of the group. Since then, Madsen had no connection with Copenhagen Suborbitals.

Rockets and engines

Spica
In 2014, Copenhagen Suborbitals settled on the basic design for their first crewed rocket and space capsule. The rocket will be named Spica and will stand 12–14 m tall with a diameter of 950 mm. It will be powered by the BPM-100 engine class, using liquid oxygen as oxidizer and ethanol as fuel, producing 100 kN of thrust. It's likely to feature pressure-blow-down tanks, optimized by a dynamic pressure regulation (DPR) system, but turbo pumps are also a possibility, although they are difficult to build. Flight control will be thrust vectoring via a gimballed engine. The rocket will be fully guided by home-built electronics and software. Most of the systems and technology will initially be tested on the smaller Nexø class rockets in 2016/18. The space capsule will be of a tubular design as its predecessor Tycho Brahe, but its greater diameter will allow the astronaut to assume a sitting position during launch and re-entry, in order to withstand the G-forces.

BPM-2 and BPM-5
In 2014/2015 the group designed, built and tested a series of smaller engines with a nominal thrust of 2 and 5 kN. The BPM-5 class will fly on the Nexø I and II rockets in 2016/2018, paving the way for the much bigger Spica rocket and engine. The purpose was to validate the performance and operation of the group's new engine design direction. The tests were highly successful, with results exceeding expectations. Different fuel additives (such as TEOS) as well as different jet vane materials were also tested. The BPM engines are bi-liquid rocket engines using LOX and ethanol, regeneratively cooled by the ethanol fuel. The spring/summer 2015 test firings used passive pressure blow-down, and in the winter 2015/2016 will see the test firings continued with a dynamic pressure (DPR) regulation system, which then will fly on the Nexø II rocket in spring 2018.

Engines and propellant 2008–2014

From 2008 to 2012, the group based the work on a hybrid rocket, using liquid oxygen (LOX) as oxidizer. Originally, the HEAT-1X rocket was to be fueled by paraffin wax, but a ground test 28 February 2010 revealed that some of the paraffin wax had only partially melted, instead of evaporating. The result was that HEAT-1X had less power than expected. A ground test firing of HEAT-1X-P (P for polyurethane) was conducted 16 May 2010. It was positive, the polyurethane had the right power but showed heavy oscillation. Until 2011 the group had performed more than 30 tests of various engine types at their rocket engine test facility at Refshaleøen. In fall of 2012 a concept engine using white fuming nitric acid and furfuryl alcohol was tried using a static test setup. In 2012 it was decided to switch to bi-propellant, liquid-fueled engines running on liquid oxygen and ethanol.

HATV

The HATV (Hybrid Atmospheric Test Vehicle) was a 220 mm diameter hybrid booster, used for testing purposes, it is one third the size of the HEAT rocket. It produces approximately 12 kN thrust within a combustion time of 20 seconds.

HEAT-1X

HEAT 1X (Hybrid Exo Atmospheric Transporter) was the rocket booster module, intended to launch the Space capsule Tycho Brahe into space, the combination being known as HEAT-1X TYCHO BRAHE.
The rocket design was the result of numerous static-booster tests of the solid fuel epoxy and the liquid oxidizer nitrous oxide. A combination which was also used in the scale-down test rocket HATV (Hybrid Atmospheric Test Vehicle) which was only one third the size of the HEAT.
Stabilization of the rocket was by rollerons, a mechanism also used to stabilize missiles. The rocket was successfully launched 3 June 2011 but the test was aborted at an altitude of 2.8 km.

TM-65 and TM-65 IIA and TM-65 IIB

TM-65 and TM6-5 IIA/B were liquid propellant engines using 75% Ethanol and liquid oxygen (LOX) as oxidizer. These engines produced about 65 kN thrust. First static tests were conducted in May 2012. One TM65 II engine was for HEAT-2X and one was for HEAT-1600 LE. The TM-65 engine passed the test undamaged, and was fired at up to 50% of its rated thrust. The group planned to repeat the test with higher thrust levels, until the TM-65 class in 2014 was abandoned in favour of the BPM-100 engine concept.

HEAT-2X
The HEAT-2X was a rocket built for flight-testing the TM-65 engine. It was planned to carry a 1:3 scale, 80 kg space capsule mock-up, TDS-80, into the stratosphere.

The rocket was not flown as it suffered an engine fire during a static test in the summer of 2014. The rocket nozzle imploded and a welding seam opened resulting in the expulsion of all the ethanol fuel (some 500 L) in just three seconds resulting in a large fire which damaged the part of the rocket.
The engine failure and subsequent fire was filmed up close with a high-speed camera, which although burned on the outside, survived the inferno enough for the film to be recovered.

HEAT-1600 LE and HEAT-1600
The HEAT-1600 LE and HEAT-1600 (after the 1600 mm diameter of the rockets), were the biggest rocket concept by the group, and was in pre-production in 2013. However, the 1600 mm diameter rocket and capsule concept was abandoned in 2014, in favour of the 950 mm diameter Spica rocket and capsule. HEAT-1600 LE was to be a full size version of the HEAT-1600 with only one TM-65 engine. The HEAT-1600 was planned to fly with a single 260 kN engine or a cluster of 4 x TM-65 engines fed by turbo pumps on a single stage.

Space capsules

Tycho Brahe 

The micro space craft (MSC), named Tycho Brahe after the Danish astronomer, has a steel pressure hull, with room for one passenger. The passenger would be able to view the outside through a Perspex dome. The occupant would fly in a half-standing/half-sitting position, in a specially designed seat, and wearing anti-G trousers to avoid blackout. Another compartment contains both the high-speed drogue parachute and the low-speed main parachutes for deceleration. The sheer volume of the MSC will provide the buoyancy in the water upon touchdown.

The first MSC was christened "Tycho Brahe 1" and its first flight was uncrewed using a crash test dummy. A new aluminium MSC called MAX-1 named after Maxime Faget was under development but has been abandoned, according to the group, due to the physiological problems associated with rapid acceleration of a human in standing position. The craft is now on display in the Tycho Brahe Planetarium in Copenhagen.

Tycho Deep Space 

Tycho Deep Space is a space capsule developed by Kristian von Bengtson. The first version officially named "Beautiful Betty" by Mikael Bertelsen, the capsule's protector. The uncrewed capsule was launched on 12 August 2012 at sea by a test Launch Escape System, off the coast of Bornholm. The launch did not provide enough height for the parachute to deploy and the capsule was partly damaged on impact with the sea. The capsule is 2m in diameter, allowing for an astronaut to be in a horizontal position relative to the acceleration during launch and landing.

Missions

The group originally focused on launching from a land based spaceport like Andøya, Kiruna, or Iceland The focus however turned towards a sea launch, just outside the territorial waters of Denmark. A permission to launch was given by Danish authorities, but the first option, the North Sea, a possibility suggested by Danish Civil Aviation Administration (Statens Luftfartsvæsen), was rejected in 2009 by the Danish Maritime Authority (Søfartsstyrelsen). They preferred another area and then gave a formal and written permission to launch from the military firing range ESD138/ESD139, which is located on the position  in the Baltic Sea.
It is just outside Nexø on the Danish island of Bornholm and is therefore nicknamed Spaceport Nexø. The CS then had to build a floating mobile launcher platform (MLP), called Sputnik after the Soviet spacecraft which was the first artificial satellite to be put into orbit.
Their launch campaigns includes the following ships:
 MLP-Sputnik, at first had to be towed, but later it had two diesel engines installed, and now sails under her own power.
 MHV Hjortø, a Naval Home Guard vessel which serves as mission control and recovery vessel.
 Two small rigid-hulled inflatable boats.

2010: The first launch attempt
The first full-scale test-launch aimed at 30 km altitude was planned to be conducted off the coast of Bornholm between 30 August and 13 September 2010. The vehicle carried a crash test dummy "Rescue Randy" instead of a human pilot, with crewed flight not planned for some years. The success criteria were the completion of the sea voyage and countdown with launch and recovery planned as a bonus.

On Tuesday, 31 August 2010, the privately built Danish submarine UC3 Nautilus pushed the launch platform Sputnik carrying the rocket and spacecraft from Copenhagen towards the launch area near Nexø, Bornholm.

A launch attempt was made on Sunday, 5 September 2010, 14:43 CEST, but the motor could not be started due to a failure of the LOX valve which is assumed to be caused by insufficient heating of the valve. The design famously included a consumer hair dryer for defrosting the LOX-valve; in effect it was not the blow-dryer but its power supply that failed.

The group promised to come back the year after to attempt the launch again.

2011: First flight of HEAT-1X Tycho Brahe

Having done updates on the rocket, and the valve, and with MLP-Sputnik under her own power, and a support vessel, the group sailed again for Spaceport Nexø on May 28 at 4:50 a.m. They again met up with MHV Hjortø, a Naval Home Guard vessel that serves as mission control and recovery vessel.
The second launch attempt was more successful and the maiden flight took place 3 June 2011, at 16:32 local time (CEST) (14:32 GMT). The HEAT-1X rocket lifted off and ascended to an altitude of only 2.8 km, because Mission Control had to shut the engine off after 21 seconds.

2012 missions

SMARAGD Flight

The SMARAGD rocket (emerald in Danish) is a 5.7 meter two-stage rocket weighing 160 kg, intended to reach an altitude of 8 km, that was used for testing various technological aspects of the operation.
On July 27, 2012, the team set out from Nexø towards the launch site, intending to launch the SMARAGD rocket. After some initial problems with the remote launch control, the rocket launched successfully just after 1 pm and reached the maximum altitude of 8.2 km. It was evident shortly after take off that the nosecone, containing electronics, broke off during launch, possibly due to the large acceleration of estimated 20 g.

Tycho Deep Space / LES flight
On 12 August 2012 at 09:18, the space capsule Tycho Deep Space, was launched to test a launch escape system. However the parachute did not deploy properly and the capsule was damaged on impact. Several media had misunderstood the schedule and proclaimed the launch to have been started prematurely due to an error. The test was considered partly successful by the team, due to the successful rocket launch and the unsuccessful parachute deployment. The launch could be followed live via live streaming from several video cameras; additionally high-speed cameras were mounted on the MLP.

2013: Guidance system development

SAPPHIRE-1 Mission
SAPPHIRE-1, a modification of the HATV, was a 4.5m rocket whose main purpose was to test the active guidance system developed by Copenhagen Suborbitals. It was successfully launched on 23 June 2013.

Nexø I
Nexø I was launched Saturday, 23 July 2016, with inaugural BPM-5 engine. It was a partial success. The supply of liquid oxygen to the engine was insufficient due to partial premature evaporation.

Nexø II
The Nexø II successfully launched on 4 August 2018, with slightly a modified BPM-5 engine. It reached an apogee of 8–12 km and was safely recovered via parachute.

Goals and records achieved
Copenhagen Suborbitals' achievements include:
 Most powerful amateur rocket ever flown.
 First amateur rocket flown with a payload of a full-size crash test dummy.
 First Main Engine(s) Cut-Off (MECO) command sent to, received and performed by an amateur rocket.
 Handling and orchestration of a sea launch, by a small-budget organization.
On 3 October 2013, Copenhagen Suborbitals was awarded the "Breitling Milestone Trophy" award by Fédération Aéronautique Internationale at a ceremony in Kuala Lumpur.

Support group
On 5 October 2010 an independent group of space enthusiasts founded the Copenhagen Suborbitals Support group (CSS). The main purpose of this group is to "support CS economically, morally and practically in their mission". Within two days after its founding, CSS reached 100 members. November 15, 2011 marked a major milestone for CSS as 500 members was reached. As of early 2014, around 1000 members were recorded.

By paying a fixed monthly amount, the members of Copenhagen Suborbitals Support now cover most of the fixed costs for the project in addition to donating various forms of hardware.

References

External links

 Copenhagen Suborbitals official website
 Wired blog written by Kristian von Bengtson of Copenhagen Suborbitals
 Project overview on Ingeniøren
 Danish blog written by the people of Copenhagen Suborbitals

 
Technology companies established in 2008
Non-profit organizations based in Denmark
Organizations based in Copenhagen
Private spaceflight companies
Rocket engine manufacturers of Denmark
Open-source hardware
Suborbital spaceflight
2008 establishments in Denmark
Amateur crewed rocketry